The Addams Family is a pinball machine released in March 1992. It was designed by Pat Lawlor and Larry DeMar and released by Midway (under the Bally label).  It was based on the 1991 film of the same name, and features custom speech (mostly derived from the motion picture) by the stars of the film, Anjelica Huston and Raul Julia. It is the best-selling solid state pinball machine of all time with 20,270 units sold.

Overview
The machine's game card describes the game objective as being to "Explore the strange world of the Addams Family".  With that in mind there is no single player goal, though there are two central objectives:

 Tour the Mansion: The Addams Family mansion is located in the center of the playfield and has 12 rooms, each of which offers a different award. Once every award is collected, a "wizard mode" called Tour the Mansion becomes available (see below).
 Vault Multiball: In the top-right section of the playfield is a blue bookcase, representing the bookcase that Gomez shows Uncle Fester in the movie, hiding the entrance to the family vault. Hits to the bookcase award letters in the word GREED; once the word is completed, the bookcase turns to expose the vault entrance. A shot to the vault locks the ball for future multiball play, or starts multiball if two balls have been previously locked. The bookcase opens for certain other modes of play as well. If a ball enters the vault while the bookcase is still closed, it immediately opens and the player is credited with locking the ball.

Other lesser objectives include:

 Bear Kicks: a ramp in the top center of the playfield awards "bear kicks" (referencing the movie scene in which a bearskin rug comes to life), awarding points or mansion rooms and lighting extra balls. Under certain circumstances, a shot to this ramp triggers Thing Flips, in which the machine takes control of the upper left flipper and tries to shoot the ball into the Swamp sinkhole at center right for extra points.
 Staircase Ramp: a left-side ramp that awards an increasing number of millions, starting at 1 million on each new ball, and letters in the word "THING" (see THING below).
 Graveyard: a set of five bumpers that increases the Graveyard Value, which is collected from the Swamp.
 Train Wreck: a dead-end shot in the top-left section that awards points, assists graveyard scoring, and lights extra balls.
 GRAVE: Five targets strewn around the field that award letters in the word "Grave", which when completed award an increasing amount of millions.
 THING: Once the word THING is completed (see Staircase Ramp above), a scoop in the top center awards bonus points.
 Skill Shot: When initially launching the ball, dropping it into the saucer in front of Thing's box just past the launch ramp awards points, starting at 2 million and increasing by 1 million per successful shot to a maximum of 5 million. A successful skill shot also collects any other benefits or awards currently lit at Thing's scoop (e.g. extra ball, Quick Multiball, THING award, locking a ball for multiball).

An electric chair is positioned above a sinkhole at the center of the playfield. At the beginning of each ball, it is lit and will award the currently flashing mansion room (rotated by the bumpers) if hit. The player must then shoot either ramp to relight the chair. The Swamp kickout hole will also award the flashing room if it is shot while the chair is lit.

Mounted beneath the central portion of the playfield is "The Power", a set of spinning magnets that can alter the path of the ball. Flashing lights in this area indicate when the Power is active.

Rules summary

Mansion
Mansion rooms are awarded by shooting the electric chair when lit, shooting the Swamp kickout hole while the chair is lit, or by reaching set threshold numbers of bear kicks. Once a mansion room is awarded, the electric chair light goes out until it is relit by a shot to either ramp (some other switches will relight it temporarily). A player can have more than one mansion room scoring mode activated simultaneously, something which is often considered good strategy. The rooms/modes are:

 3 Million, 6 Million, 9 Million: Separate rooms that award that many points. On normal difficulty settings, collecting either the 3 Million or 6 Million award immediately spots the other one as well.
 Graveyard at Max: Advances all five jet bumpers to their maximum value (30,000 added to the Graveyard Value per hit).
 The Mamushka: Adds 1 million to the end-of-ball bonus, plus 250,000 for every switch the player hits in 20 seconds.
 Hit Cousin It: Adds 1 million to the end-of-ball bonus, plus 200,000 for every switch the player hits in 20 seconds. Each hit to the Cousin It target behind the electric chair adds 2 million and increases the per-switch value by 50,000.
 Quick Multiball: Lights "Quick Multiball", allowing the player to start a two-ball multiball by shooting Thing's scoop. The vault opens, awarding a value that starts at 5 million and increases by 1 million every time it is collected or the center ramp is shot, to a maximum of 10 million.
 Fester's Tunnel Hunt: Awards 5, 10, and 15 million points for hitting the swamp, electric chair and vault. This round ends after 20 seconds or once all three shots have been made, whichever comes first. 
 Seance: Awards 5, 10, and 15 million points for each shot to either ramp. This round ends after 20 seconds or three ramp shots, whichever comes first. "The Power" magnets are activated during this mode.
 Get Ball to Thing: A "hurry-up" mode with a point value decreasing from 15 million to 3 million. If the player shoots Thing's scoop before it times out, the remaining points are awarded and a two-ball multiball begins, with shots to the vault awarding the same value again.
 Raise the Dead: Adds 2 million to the end-of-ball bonus, plus 100,000 for each bumper hit, or 3 million for hitting a bumper four times. The round ends after 30 seconds or once all five bumpers are hit four times each, whichever comes first.
 Lite Extra Ball: The extra ball becomes available at Thing's scoop. If a player earns a total of five extra balls during a single game, each one thereafter awards a score bonus.

Once the player has collected all 12 Mansion Rooms, the game's "wizard mode" becomes available and will start on the next shot to the electric chair:

 Tour the Mansion: Awards the player 50 million points, lights the extra ball, lights the "special" (free game) on the outlanes, maximizes the five jet bumpers, and starts each of the six timed modes automatically, one after the other. After the last mode, the player will not be able to collect any more Mansion Rooms until the start of the next ball; losing the current ball during Tour the Mansion immediately ends it.

Vault Multiball
The player can add letters to the word "GREED" by hitting the bookcase in front of the vault. Spelling "GREED" opens the bookcase, revealing a shot into the vault that can be used to "lock" (hold) balls for multiball; for the first multiball, the swamp can also be used to lock balls. The Power turns on for the player's attempt to lock the third and final ball. Multiball can be started from the vault or, for the first multiball, the electric chair.

Once multiball begins, the Power remains active and the Train Wreck shot lights up for a Jackpot. The Staircase Ramp lights up for a Super Jackpot (Double on the first multiball, Triple on all others). The Jackpot starts out at 10 million, and increases by one million for every Bear Kicks shot or shot to a closed vault during the multiball (to a maximum of 25 million). After either jackpot is scored, the vault re-opens, and a successful shot to it re-lights only the Staircase Ramp. The player may continue to do this as long as two or more balls are in play.

If two balls drain without any jackpot being scored, the player is given 20 seconds to shoot Thing's scoop and restart multiball, but with two balls instead of three. The jackpot resumes its previous value, and another restart chance is not given if the player fails to score a jackpot before one ball drains.

Special Collectors Edition
In October 1994, Bally produced a so called "Special Collectors Edition", often referred to as The Addams Family Gold. Towards the end of the original production run of The Addams Family some machines had been produced with golden features to celebrate the machine's sales record. The "Special Collectors Edition" similarly featured specially designed gold accents on the playfield/cabinet and an updated software program.

The game also included some play enhancements, as noted below:

 The "Seance" Mansion Award could randomly be designated as "Super Seance", with ramp values increased to 10/15/20 million.
 Some rooms would randomly award an item belonging to Cousin It, such as his hat or car keys, and a bonus consisting of points, a lit extra ball, or a lit special. The item was given in addition to the award for the flashing room.
 The 3 Million room not only awarded the points, but allowed the player to travel through "Pugsley and Wednesday's Trap Door" to receive a second Mansion award, chosen at random from any not yet collected.
 The 3 Million and 6 Million rooms were decoupled from one another and had to be earned separately.
 New quotes and dot matrix graphics were added.

Only one thousand machines of the Special Collectors Edition were ever produced, each carrying the number (0001-1000) on a plaque below the coin door. A certificate with the corresponding number and the signatures of production and development team members was also unique for this edition.

Hidden game codes
The Addams Family pinball contains two known Easter eggs—plus a third egg in the Special Collectors Edition—each of which can be accessed using a flipper and Start button code sequence specific to each egg. The results produced are cosmetic in nature only; they do not modify actual game play in any way.

The codes work only under the following conditions: The machine must be in its Attract or "game over" mode (no game currently in progress). There must also be no credits on the machine. The Start button cannot be flashing to begin a new game; consequently, the codes will never work if the machine is set for free play.

The codes may also temporarily stop working if they are done too many times in a row, allowing the Attract mode display screens to cycle all the way through (at least 1 or 2 minutes) before trying a code again should rectify this.

The available Easter eggs and how to activate them:

 "When Cows Fight": This is a dot-matrix still that appears on the display for about three seconds. Press the left flipper button 7 times, start once, right flipper button 14 times, start once, left button 20 times and start once.
 "When Cows Dig for Gold" (collectors edition only): Press the left button 12 times, Start button once, right button 5 times, start once, left 4 times and start once. 
 Design credits: Press the left button 13 times, start button once, right once, start once, left 2 times and start once.

Aftermarket modifications

Some aftermarket modifications may be found in some machines:
 A ColorDMD full color display that replaces the original orange DMD.
 An Uncle Fester model sitting in the electric chair. He has a light bulb in his mouth replacing the light on the left side of the chair.
 A white bear above the base of the central staircase ramp where one shoots for bear kicks.
 A bronze colored vault on top of the vault shot hole.
 A Cousin It model above the Cousin It targets. This modification may trap balls.
 A bronze colored train near the train shot.
 A bronze colored phone near Thing's box.
 A bronze colored suit of armor in the back center.
 A miniature Tiffany-style lamp near Thing's box.

Digital versions
A version of this table was in development for the PC and was also going to be released on the Nintendo 64 and would be developed by Digital Eclipse and published by GT Interactive, but was cancelled. 

The game is also supported by Visual Pinball, which can also be made by some people to play through a home made pinball cabinet, like the original but digitally emulated.

In July 2014, FarSight Studios released The Pinball Arcade Newsletter 29 indicating they "agreed upon terms with all of the major licenses and clearances" needed to digitally recreate this table. A Kickstarter to raise the $97,640 needed for licensing was initiated on September 12, and successfully funded $115,276 on its closing date of October 12.

Farsight Studios released their digitized version of the table in February 2015 as part of the Season Four package of The Pinball Arcade on iOS, Android, Amazon, Steam (PC & Mac) and OUYA. The image of Christopher Lloyd was removed in this version due to licensing issues. The "Special Collectors Gold Edition" was one of the rewards for those who pledged over  
$100 during the Kickstarter campaign. By June 30, 2018, the table is no longer available, due to losing the license of WMS.

Zen Studios released a digitized version of the table in February 2023 as part of Pinball FX on Playstation, Xbox and Epic Games Store.

References

External links
 
 
 Pinpedia Database Entry: The Addams Family
 Arcade History: The Addams Family
 
 Pinball Archive rule sheet for The Addams Family
 The Addams Family promo video
 The Addams Family Owners Community

1992 pinball machines
Pinball machines based on television series
Pinball machines based on films
The Addams Family
Bally pinball machines